The Shinjuku Gyo-en Greenhouse is a greenhouse in Shinjuku Gyo-en, Shinjuku, Tokyo, Japan. It was built in 1950 and displays more than 1,700 tropical and subtropical plant species, as of 2016.

History 
The Shinjuku Gyo-en Greenhouse was built on the site of a private mansion, property of daimyō Naitō Nobunari. 

A government-managed agricultural experiment station was established there in 1872, and was later converted into an imperial garden in 1906. The space was utilised for international diplomacy, and was re-designed and opened to the public after World War II. 

The Greenhouse's construction was completed in 1950.

References

External links

 

1950 establishments in Japan
Buildings and structures completed in 1950
Greenhouses in Japan
Buildings and structures in Shinjuku